Katrín is a feminine given name. It is an Icelandic form of Katherine. Notable people with the name include:

 Guðrún Katrín Þorbergsdóttir, the First Lady of Iceland (1996 - 1998)
 Þorgerður Katrín Gunnarsdóttir, Icelandic politician
 Katrín Jakobsdóttir, Icelandic politician
 Katrín Inga Jónsdóttir Hjördísardóttir, Icelandic Contemporary Artist

References

See also
 KATRIN, experiment to measure the mass of the electron neutrino with sub-eV precision
 Katharine 
 Katrina 
 Katrin
 Catherine

Icelandic feminine given names